Sybra nigromarmorata is a species of beetle in the family Cerambycidae. It was described by Breuning in 1939. It is known from Borneo.

References

nigromarmorata
Beetles described in 1939